Katibas River is a river in Sarawak, Malaysia. It is a tributary of the Rajang River.

See also
 List of rivers of Malaysia

References

Rivers of Sarawak
Rivers of Malaysia